Antony Claud Frederick Lambton, (10 July 1922 – 30 December 2006), briefly 6th Earl of Durham, styled before 1970 as Viscount Lambton, and widely known as Lord Lambton, was a Conservative Member of Parliament and a cousin of Sir Alec Douglas-Home, the former Prime Minister and Foreign Secretary. Lambton resigned from Parliament and ministerial office in 1973.

Biography
Lambton was born in Compton, Sussex, the second son of Diana Mary (née Farquhar) and John Lambton, 5th Earl of Durham. He grew up on the family estates centred on Lambton Castle near Washington in County Durham, actually living at the nearby Biddick Hall. He was educated at Harrow School and served in the Hampshire Regiment during the Second World War, before being invalided out. He then did war work in a Wallsend factory.

Marriage and children
Lambton married Belinda Bridget (Bindy) Blew-Jones (born 23 December 1921, died 13 February 2003) on 10 August 1942. She was the daughter of Major Douglas Holden Blew-Jones and his wife Violet Hilda Margaret Birkin, sister of Freda Dudley Ward. They had five daughters and one son:

 Lady Lucinda Lambton (born 10 May 1943)
 Lady Beatrix Mary Lambton (born 23 July 1949)
 Lady Rose Diana Lambton (26 November 1952 - 5 April 2022)
 Lady Anne Mary Gabrielle Lambton (born 4 July 1954)
 Lady Isabella Lambton (born 17 May 1958), married to Sir Philip Naylor-Leyland, 4th Baronet
 Edward Richard Lambton, 7th Earl of Durham (born 19 October 1961)

Politics

Member of Parliament
Lambton first stood for Parliament at the 1945 general election in the safe Labour seat of Chester-le-Street, then Bishop Auckland in 1950. He was elected to Durham City Council and to Durham County Council in 1947, serving for two years. He was elected Member of Parliament for Berwick-upon-Tweed in 1951 where he served until 1973.

Under-Secretary of State
Lambton was made a Parliamentary Under-Secretary of State for Defence (RAF) in 1970. He succeeded to the Earldom of Durham upon his father's death on 4 February 1970 but disclaimed it on 23 February to continue as an MP and Government Minister. He nonetheless insisted on being addressed as "Lord Lambton", the form of address appropriate to his former courtesy title, though a ruling of the Committee for Privileges said that he should not do so in the House of Commons since he had renounced his peerage. Contradictory rulings from two Speakers, Horace King and Selwyn Lloyd, then left the point unresolved.

Resignation
In 1973, Lambton's liaisons with prostitutes were revealed in the Sunday tabloid The News of the World. The husband of one of the prostitutes, Norma Levy, had secretly taken photographs of Lambton in bed with Levy and had attempted to sell the photographs to Fleet Street tabloids. As well, a police search of Lambton's home found a small amount of cannabis. On 22 May, Lambton resigned from both his office and Parliament; this caused a by-election for his seat which was won by Alan Beith for the Liberal Party. Shortly after, the name Jellicoe emerged in connection to a rendezvous for one of Norma's girls at a Somers Town mansion block which had been named Jellicoe House, after the earl's kinsman Basil Jellicoe (1899–1935), the housing reformer and priest from Magdalen College (Oxford). There was a confusion and Lord Jellicoe, the Lord Privy Seal and Leader of the House of Lords, admitted 'casual affairs' with prostitutes from a Mayfair escort agency but denied knowing Norma Levy.

A security inquiry on the prostitution scandal concluded that there had been "nothing in (Lambton's) conduct to suggest that the risk of indiscretions on these occasions was other than negligible". Lambton stated that he had never taken his red state boxes of government documents with him when he visited Norma Levy. The security inquiry was held due to fears that the prostitution scandal may have involved an actual or potential breach of national security (as had occurred in the Profumo scandal in the 1960s).

When Lambton was interviewed by MI5 officer Charles Elwell, Lambton first claimed that the pressure of his job as a minister was what drove him to procure the prostitutes. Later, Lambton stated that his sense of "the futility of the job" and lack of demanding tasks as a junior minister were reasons he went to prostitutes. Finally, Lambton claimed that his judgment was faulty when he went to the prostitutes due to his obsession with the battle over the use of an aristocratic title that had been used by his father; Lambton claimed that he sought to soothe this obsession by engaging in frantic activities such as gardening and debauchery.

Later years

Following the scandal, Lambton retired, separated from his wife and bought Villa Cetinale, a 17th-century villa in Tuscany, where he lived with Claire Ward, born Claire Leonora Baring, mother of actress Rachel Ward and daughter of the cricketer Giles Baring. He never divorced his wife Bindy, who died in 2003.

In 1991, he made an extended appearance on the TV discussion programme After Dark, chaired by Helena Kennedy, alongside Duncan Campbell, Jane Moore, Clare Short, Anthony Howard and others.

Despite renouncing his titles, he continued to use his former courtesy title Viscount Lambton, although, since it was now a title that had passed by courtesy to his eldest son, it was argued by Sir Anthony Wagner and others that this was incorrect. Lambton died in hospital in Siena, Italy, on 30 December 2006.

References

External links

1922 births
2006 deaths
British Army personnel of World War II
Conservative Party (UK) MPs for English constituencies
Councillors in County Durham
Durham, Antony Lambton, 6th Earl of
Antony
Members of the Privy Council of the United Kingdom
People educated at Harrow School
People from Berwick-upon-Tweed
Politics of Northumberland
Political sex scandals in the United Kingdom
Royal Hampshire Regiment officers
UK MPs 1951–1955
UK MPs 1955–1959
UK MPs 1959–1964
UK MPs 1964–1966
UK MPs 1966–1970
UK MPs 1970–1974
Durham, E6